Global Gathering was an annual dance music festival by Angel Festivals Limited. Festivals are held in countries such as the UK, Poland, Russia, Belarus, Ukraine and feature leading electronic music artists from around the globe. The festival ran from 2001 to 2014; the concept came about following enormous interest in the opening Code club (now Air), the home of Godskitchen. The organisers recognised that there was room to expand dance music from clubs to outdoor music festival venues.

Locations
  Long Marston Airfield, Long Marston, Warwickshire, England
  Tor Poznań, Poznań, Poland
  Borovaya Airfield, Belarus
  Chaika Airfield, Kyiv, Ukraine
  Tuutary Park, Saint Petersburg, Russia
  Seoul Olympic Stadium, Seoul, South Korea
  Rustavi International Motorpark, Rustavi, Georgia

History

Held on the last weekend of July each year, GlobalGathering in the UK has established itself as a major UK dance festival since it began in 2001. It is held at Long Marston Airfield near Stratford-upon-Avon. It provides entertainment from a range of electronic genres, and includes live acts, drum and bass, house, trance and dubstep. The festival has grown to play host to over one hundred acts on sixteen stages, and has twice won the award for Best UK Festival in the DJ Magazine awards, including 2010.

On 18 March 2006, Global Gathering travelled to Miami, Florida. The festival included acts such as Nine Inch Nails, Coheed and Cambria, Avenged Sevenfold, Deep Dish, Adam Freeland, Sasha, John Digweed and others. In 2008, GlobalGathering shows included Poland, Belarus, Ukraine, Russia, Turkey, Australia, and Malaysia. In 2009, Poland, Belarus, Turkey, Ukraine, Russia, South Korea and Australia played host.

On 28 July 2012, during the Global Gathering 2012 event, paramedics were called to Long Marston Airfield near Stratford-upon-Avon after a 24-year-old man had been found unconscious in his tent. Despite efforts to resuscitate him, he died. It is the first death in the 12-year history of the annual festival.

Global Gathering 2014 recorded the second death during the event's 14-year history.

On 26 October 2014 the promoters of Global Gathering, Angel Festivals Limited, announced the festival will not take place in 2015. A statement on their website read:
"After 13 years of delivering one of the UK’s most successful electronic dance music events, the promoters of the GlobalGathering UK festival have decided that the festival will take a break in 2015 in order for all elements of the show to be reviewed ensuring GG remains at the heart of the UK dance market. This will not affect any of the GG club shows in the UK or international GG events. Thanks to all of our loyal fans for your continued support, please check the website for further updates".

List of Global Gatherings

Global Gathering 2001
Global Gathering 2002
Global Gathering 2003
Global Gathering 2004
Global Gathering 2005
Global Gathering 2006
Global Gathering 2007
Global Gathering 2008
Global Gathering 2009
Global Gathering 2010
Global Gathering 2011
Global Gathering 2012
Global Gathering 2013 took place on 26 and 27 July.
Global Gathering 2014 took place on 25 and 26 July, with an attendance of 55,000.

Notes
Report about GlobalGathering Russia 2009
Report about GlobalGathering Russia 2010

See also
List of electronic music festivals

References

External links

 
Music festivals in Warwickshire
Rave
Electronic music festivals in Russia
Electronic music festivals in the United Kingdom
Electronic music festivals in Belarus
Electronic music festivals in Poland
Electronic music festivals in Ukraine
Music festivals established in 2001